Fikile Zachariah Majola is a South African politician currently serving as the Deputy Minister of Trade and Industry. He has been a Member of Parliament (MP) for the African National Congress since 2014. He is a former Chairperson of the Portfolio Committee on Energy.

References

External links

Profile at Parliament of South Africa
Fikile Majola, Mr at Government of South Africa

Living people
Year of birth missing (living people)
Place of birth missing (living people)
African National Congress politicians
Members of the National Assembly of South Africa